Rakett69 is an Estonian science competition show, broadcast by Estonian Television and funded by the Estonian Research Council.

European Broadcasting Union elected "Rakett69" as best educational TV show in Europe in spring 2012. It also won Estonian Science Communication Award in the same year.

The objective of the program is to popularize the natural sciences in Estonia. The contestants run for the €10,000 scholarship to further pursue their career in their chosen field of science. The targeted audience of the program is 75,000 people.

Set-Up  
After a talent show, where each individual shows a bit of what they know, a panel of three judges chooses the few who are good enough to compete for the prize. The chosen contestants are initially divided into three teams, each with its own colour. In each episode the teams are given three assignments of varying difficulty, each with its own time limit. The judging panel awards points, depending on how well each team handled the assignments. The team with the fewest points at the end of the episode must vote a member out (technically, they vote for which team members they want to remain in the show). This goes on until there aren't enough contestants for three teams. The remaining contestants are divided into two teams and the show goes on, with the judges now deciding who remains from the losing team. When the contestants are down to three, they are split up and given neutral assistants to help them handle the assignments.

In the final, the remaining two contestants go head to head in some given theme to get the prize pool of €10,000.

Seasons

References

External links 
 Rakett69 on Facebook
 Overview of Rakett69 on Vimeo
 IMDB page

2010s Estonian television series
2011 Estonian television series debuts
Eesti Televisioon original programming